This is a list of newspapers in Solomon Islands.

Print
Solomon Star (Honiara)
Island Sun (Honiara)
Sunday Isles (Honiara)

Online
Solomon Times Online (Honiara)
Solomonstoday.com (Honiara)
Solomon Islands Herald (Honiara)

ld (Honiara)

See also
List of newspapers

External links
 Solomon Star Online website
 Island Sun Online website
 Sunday Isles website
 Solomon Times Online website
 The Solomon Islands Herald website

Solomon Islands
Newspapers